"Shams al-'Ashiya" is a piece of Andalusi nawbah, a form of strophic poetry. It's one of the most popular songs sung on holidays and celebrations in Morocco—especially Eid al-Fitr.

Composition 
It is a piece of zajal poetry, meaning that it is in Andalusi dialectical Arabic rather than Standard Arabic. It spread throughout Morocco, though its author/composer is unknown.

Renditions 
The rendition by Mohamed Bajeddoub is also very popular. 

Recently, it has also been reinterpreted by Nabyla Maan.

Content 
The subject of the poem is the setting sun, which can be interpreted as a metaphor for the departure or loss of a friend or loved one.

The piece also attests to historic trade relations between the region and the Venetian Republic, as the song mentions "al-Awani l-Bunduqiya" ("the Venetian glassware") imported from Venice.

References 

Literature of Al-Andalus
Andalusian music
Poems
Moroccan music
Moroccan culture